"Six White Horses" is a song written by Larry Murray and recorded by Tommy Cash in 1969. Cash's recording reached number four on the Billboard country charts and number 79 on the Billboard Hot 100. It made it to number one on RPM Magazine's Canadian country chart.

Chart performance

Other Songs Titled Six White Horses
Other songs with the same title include:
 a 1940 release by Bill Monroe And His Bluegrass Boys, with Clyde Moody (who wrote the song), Tommy Magness, and Cousin Wilbur,
 a composition by Bobby Bond, first released in 1968 by Henson Cargill.

References

1969 songs
Tommy Cash songs